The Parting Glass is a 2018 American-Canadian drama film written by Denis O'Hare, directed by Stephen Moyer and starring Ed Asner, Rhys Ifans, Melissa Leo, Cynthia Nixon, Anna Paquin and O'Hare.  It is Moyer's feature directorial debut.

Cast
Melissa Leo as Al
Cynthia Nixon as Mare
Denis O'Hare as Danny
Ed Asner as Tommy
Rhys Ifans as Karl
Anna Paquin as Colleen
Oluniké Adeliyi as Sue
Paul Gross as Sean

Release
The film premiered at the Edinburgh International Film Festival in June 2018.  The film was then released on digital platforms on September 10, 2019.

Reception
Sandy Schaefer of Screen Rant awarded the film three and a half stars out of five.

References

External links
 
 

English-language Canadian films
Canadian drama films
American drama films
2018 drama films
2018 films
2010s English-language films
2010s Canadian films
2010s American films